David J. Beauchamp (born September 9, 1940) was an American politician.

Beauchamp was born in Langdon, Cavalier County, North Dakota. He received his bachelor's degree in biology from College of Saint Benedict and Saint John's University, in Collegeville, Minnesota, in 1962 and his master's degree in counseling from University of North Dakota. Beauchamp served in the United States Peace Corps in Thailand from 1963 to 1965. Beauchamp lived in Moorhead, Minnesota with his wife and family and was a financial aid officer. Beauchamp served in the Minnesota House of Representatives from 1975 to 1978 and was a Democrat.

References

1940 births
Living people
People from Cavalier County, North Dakota
People from Moorhead, Minnesota
College of Saint Benedict and Saint John's University alumni
University of North Dakota alumni
Peace Corps volunteers
Democratic Party members of the Minnesota House of Representatives